National Peacekeepers' Day is an official remembrance day for Canadian veterans of military peacekeeping activities. It is officially marked on 9 August of each year and alternately may be observed on the closest Sunday.

The date was chosen to commemorate 9 August 1974, when nine Canadian peacekeepers serving on UNEF II were killed when their aircraft was shot down over Syria, the highest number of Canadian peacekeepers killed in a single incident.

While British Columbia Order in Council 856 first set August 9 as Peacekeepers memorial day on June 30, 1993, Federal legislation to make the day an official national day in Canada was passed in June 2008.

See also
International Day of United Nations Peacekeepers

References

August observances